The following lists events that happened during 1828 in New Zealand.

Incumbents

Regal and viceregal
Head of State – King George IV
Governor of New South Wales – General Ralph Darling

Events 
3, 6 or 7 March - Ngāpuhi rangatira (chief) and war leader Hongi Hika dies at Whangaroa.
 4 May - The 40-ton schooner Enterprise, the second sailing ship built in New Zealand, is wrecked in a storm north of the Hokianga, with the loss of all hands.
 6 May - The 55-ton schooner , the first sailing ship built in New Zealand, is wreaked on the Hokianga bar, with no loss of life.

Undated
John Guard establishes a subsidiary whaling station at Kakapo Bay in Port Underwood. (see 1827)
Phillip Tapsell sets up a flax trading post at Maketu.
Whalers Dicky Barrett, Jacky Love and others establish a trading post at Ngamotu Beach, the first Europeans to settle in the New Plymouth area.

Births
 15 February (in Prussia): Gustavus von Tempsky, adventurer, soldier and painter.
 23 March (in Scotland): Charles O'Neill, politician and philanthropist.
Undated
 Thomas Gillies, politician.
Approximate
 Tohu Kākahi, Māori prophet and pacifist leader.

Deaths
3, 6 or 7 March (see above) Hongi Hika, New Zealand Chief (born 1772)
Undated
 Te Whareumu, Ngati Manu chief.

See also
List of years in New Zealand
Timeline of New Zealand history
History of New Zealand
Military history of New Zealand
Timeline of the New Zealand environment
Timeline of New Zealand's links with Antarctica

References